The Lanterman Range is a mountain range about  long and  wide, forming the southwest part of the Bowers Mountains in Antarctica. It is bounded by the Rennick, Sledgers, Black and Canham Glaciers. The range was mapped by United States Geological Survey from surveys and U.S. Navy air photos, 1960–62, and was named by the Advisory Committee on Antarctic Names for Commander William Lanterman, an aerological officer for U.S. Navy Operation Deep Freeze, 1959–62.

Features 
Geographical features include:

 All Black Peak
 Bowers Peak
 Carnes Crag
 Coesite
 Crown Hill
 Half Black Peak
 Hoshko Glacier
 Hunter Glacier
 Husky Pass
 Johnstone Glacier
 Linder Glacier
 MacKinnon Glacier
 Mount Bernstein
 Mount Edixon
 Mount Lugering
 Orr Glacier
 Reilly Ridge
 Rowell Peak
 Sledgers Glacier
 Zenith Glacier

Further reading 
 Gunter Faure, Teresa M. Mensing, The Transantarctic Mountains: Rocks, Ice, Meteorites and Water, P 115
 G. Di Vincenzo, R. Palmeri, F. Talarico, P.A.M. Andriessen, G.A. Ricci, Petrology and Geochronology of Eclogites from the Lanterman Range, Antarctica, Journal of Petrology, Volume 38, Issue 10, October 1997, Pages 1391–1417, https://doi.org/10.1093/petroj/38.10.1391
 R. Palmeri, F.M. Talarico, C.A. Ricci, Ultrahigh‐pressure metamorphism at the Lanterman Range (northern Victoria Land, Antarctica), Geological JournalVolume46, Issue2‐3 Special Issue: Extreme metamorphism and continental dynamics: Guest Edited by M. Santosh, March ‐ June 2011, Pages 126–136, https://doi.org/10.1002/gj.1243
 Ruppel, Antonia; Läufer, Andreas; Crispini, Laura; Capponi, Giovanni; Lisker, Frank, A high-resolution aeromagnetic survey over the Lanterman Range, northern Victoria Land, Antarctica, 19th EGU General Assembly, EGU2017, proceedings from the conference held 23-28 April, 2017 in Vienna, Austria., p.14182
 Capponi, Giovanni & Crispini, Laura & Meccheri, Marco. (1999), The metaconglomerates of the eastern Lanterman Range (northern Victoria Land, Antarctica): New constraints for their interpretation, ANTARCTIC SCIENCE. 11. 217–227. https://doi.org/10.1017/S0954102099000280
 Kim, D., Kim, T., Lee, J. et al., Microfabrics of omphacite and garnet in eclogite from the Lanterman Range, northern Victoria Land, Antarctica, Geosci J 22, 939–953 (2018) https://doi.org/10.1007/s12303-018-0055-7
 Ghiribelli, Barbara; Frezzotti, Maria-Luce; Palmeri, Rosaria, Coesite in eclogites of the Lanterman Range (Antarctica): Evidence from textural and Raman studies, European Journal of Mineralogy Volume 14 Number 2 (2002), p. 355 - 360, Mar 22, 2002, https://doi.org/10.1127/0935-1221/2002/0014-0355
 Christopher J. Adams, Style of Uplift of Paleozoic Terranes in Northern Victoria Land, Antarctica: Evidence from K-Ar Age Patterns, Fütterer, D K, Damaske, D, Kleinschmidt, G, Miller, H & Tessensohn, F (eds.), Antarctica: contributions to global earth sciences, Springer, Berlin, Heidelberg, New York, 45-54 http://dx.doi.org/10.1007/3-540-32934-X
 J. D. Bradshaw, S. D. Weaver, M. G. Laird, Suspect Terranes and Cambrian Tectonics in Northern Victoria Land, Antarctica, CircumPacific Council for Energy and Mineral Resources 2008 – Tectonostratigrahic Terranes of the Circum-Pacific Region, Earth Science Series, Number 1, 1985.
 Crispini, L.; Capponi, G.; Federico, L.; and Talarico, F., Gold bearing v Gold bearing veining link eining linked to transcrustal fault z anscrustal fault  Zones in the ones in the Transantar ansantarctic Mountains (nor ctic Mountains (northern Vict thern Victoria Land, Antar oria Land, Antarctica)',  (2007). Related Publications from ANDRILL Affiliates. 20. https://digitalcommons.unl.edu/andrillaffiliates/20

External links 

 Lanterman Range on USGS website
 Lanterman Range on AADC website
 Lanterman Range on SCAR website
 Lanterman Range area satellite image

References 

Mountain ranges of Victoria Land
Pennell Coast